USS McDougal (Destroyer No. 54/DD-54) was an  built for the United States Navy prior to the American entry into World War I. The ship was the second U.S. Navy vessel named in honor of David Stockton McDougal, a U.S. Navy officer notable for his leadership during an 1863 battle off Japan while in command of .

McDougal was laid down by Bath Iron Works of Bath, Maine, in July 1913 and launched in April 1914. She was armed with four  guns and had eight 21-inch (533 mm) torpedo tubes.

After her June 1914 commissioning, McDougal sailed off the east coast and in the Caribbean. After the United States entered World War I in April 1917, McDougal was part of the first U.S. destroyer squadron sent overseas. Patrolling the Irish Sea out of Queenstown, Ireland, McDougal made several unsuccessful attacks on U-boats, and rescued survivors of ships sunk by the German craft. After a collision with a British cargo ship in February 1918, McDougal was under repair until mid-July, and afterwards, operated out of Brest, France.

Upon returning to the United States after the war, McDougal conducted operations with the destroyers of the Atlantic Fleet until August 1919, when she was placed in reserve, still in commission. After a brief stint of operations in mid 1921, she was placed in reserve until she was decommissioned at Philadelphia in May 1922. In June 1924, Ericsson was transferred to the United States Coast Guard to help enforce Prohibition as a part of the "Rum Patrol". She operated under the name USCGC McDougal (CG-6) until May 1933, when she was returned to the Navy. In November she dropped her name to free it for a new destroyer of the same name, becoming known only as DD-54. She was struck for the Naval Vessel Register in July 1934 and sold for scrapping in August.

Design and construction 
Construction of the vessel was awarded to Bath Iron Works of Bath, Maine, which laid down her keel on 29 July 1913. On 22 April 1914, McDougal was launched by sponsor Miss Marguerite S. LeBreton, granddaughter of the Commander David Stockton McDougal, the ship's namesake.

McDougal had two Zoelly steam turbines that drove her two screw propellers, and an additional triple-expansion steam engine connected to one of the propeller shafts for cruising purposes.

McDougal was also equipped with eight  torpedo tubes. The General Board of the United States Navy had called for two anti-aircraft guns for the O'Brien-class ships, as well as provisions for laying up to 36 floating mines. From sources, it is unclear if these recommendations were followed for McDougal or any of the other ships of the class.

Early career 
USS McDougal was commissioned into the United States Navy on 16 June 1914 at Boston under the temporary command of Lieutenant, junior grade, John H. Hoover; Lieutenant Commander Leigh C. Palmer assumed command on 27 July. After a shakedown cruise, McDougal began duty with the Torpedo Flotilla, Atlantic Fleet. Prior to America's entry into World War I, she operated out of New York and Newport, Rhode Island, and carried out maneuvers and tactical exercises along the east coast.

In early April 1915, McDougal and destroyer  were temporarily assigned to patrol near the New York Quarantine Station. There were concerns by Dudley Field Malone, the local port collector, that some of the interned German steamships at New York might try to slip out during a heavy snowstorm. While on board McDougal during one of these patrols, Malone discovered what The New York Times termed a "widespread conspiracy" intended to supply British warships outside U.S. territorial waters, in violation of the American neutrality in World War I.

She cruised to the Caribbean and took part in fleet war games between January and May 1916, and in addition served intermittently with the Neutrality patrol. In June, The Washington Post reported that she was damaged during maneuvers off Cape Ann, and had to put into the Boston Navy Yard for leak repairs.

At 05:30 on Sunday, 8 October 1916, wireless reports came in of a German submarine stopping ships near the Lightship Nantucket, off the eastern end of Long Island. After an SOS from the British steamer  was received at about 12:30, Rear Admiral Albert Gleaves ordered McDougal and other destroyers at Newport to attend to survivors. According to a firsthand account of the events by Nathan Levy, a quartermaster on McDougal, published on 22 October in The New York Times, the destroyer steamed the  distance to the lightship in three-and-a-half hours, arriving after German submarine  had stopped the Holland America Line cargo ship  and the British passenger ship . As Rose had done with three other ships U-53 had sunk earlier in the day, he gave passengers and crew aboard Blommersdijk and Stephano adequate time to abandon the ships. Six American destroyers witnessed U-53 sink the liner with her deck gun. In total, 226 survivors from U-53s five victims were rescued by the destroyer flotilla; McDougal rescued 6 of Blommersdijks men.

McDougal returned to the Caribbean for exercises during the first three months of 1917, and then returned to New York and Newport to prepare for distant service.

World War I 
Soon after the United States declared war on Germany on 6 April 1917, McDougal departed for Europe as a part of the first U.S. destroyer division sent overseas during the war. McDougal patrolled off the Irish coast, escorting convoys of merchant ships and troop transports, searching for German submarines, and performing rescue operations for ships sunk.

On 8 September, as McDougal escorted a convoy off the southwest coast of England, she detected a surfaced submarine in the early morning hours and gave chase at full speed. The U-boat submerged about  ahead of the closing destroyer, and McDougal dropped two depth charges which brought an oil slick to the surface. According to the Dictionary of American Naval Fighting Ships, McDougals actions prevented an attack on the convoy and resulted in "probable damage" to the submarine.

On 4 February 1918, McDougal and the British cargo ship Glenmorag collided in the Irish Sea. The destroyer made her way to Liverpool and underwent repairs that lasted until mid-July. Upon reentering service, McDougal was transferred to Brest to serve as an escort for convoys approaching the French port.

Postwar 

Following the signing of the Armistice on 11 November 1918, which ended all fighting, McDougal remained in French waters for a time. Crewmen aboard McDougal helped raise money to provide a Thanksgiving dinner for 150 "poor children" of Brest on 28 November, Thanksgiving Day in the United States. When President Woodrow Wilson arrived at Brest on  just over two weeks later, the destroyer served as part of that transport's escort into the harbor. On 21 December, McDougal departed Brest 21 December with Destroyer Division 7 and reached New York 8 January 1919.

McDougal resumed duty along the east coast and, during May, provided part of the comprehensive at-sea support as U.S. Navy seaplanes undertook the historic first aerial crossing of the Atlantic. After completing exercises in the Caribbean, she was placed in commission, in reserve at New York on 7 August. She was laid up in reduced commission at Philadelphia and Charleston, South Carolina, in the years that followed. She was reactivated for training in New England waters during the summer of 1921, but returned to Philadelphia, where she was decommissioned on 26 May 1922.

United States Coast Guard career 
On 17 January 1920, Prohibition was instituted by law in the United States. Soon, the smuggling of alcoholic beverages along the coastlines of the United States became widespread and blatant. The Treasury Department eventually determined that the United States Coast Guard simply did not have the ships to constitute a successful patrol. To cope with the problem, President Calvin Coolidge in 1924 authorized the transfer from the Navy to the Coast Guard of twenty old destroyers that were in reserve and out of commission. McDougal was activated and acquired by the Coast Guard on 7 June 1924. Designated CG-6, McDougal was commissioned on 28 May 1925, and joined the "Rum Patrol" to aid in the attempt to enforce prohibition laws.

In April 1933, McDougal was one of the Coast Guard ships deployed to search for the U.S. Navy airship  when it crashed into the Atlantic on the night of 3/4 April. Later that same month, McDougal was dispatched to help the Italian steamer Voluntas when she had requested assistance on the 23rd, but was recalled when Voluntas rescinded the call for help.

After nearly eight years of Coast Guard service, McDougal was decommissioned at Philadelphia on 26 May 1933 and returned to the custody of the U.S. Navy on 30 June. On 1 November 1933, she dropped the name McDougal to free it for a new destroyer of the same name, becoming known only as DD-54. The ship was struck from the Naval Vessel Register on 5 July 1934, and, on 22 August, was sold for scrapping in accordance with the London Naval Treaty for the limitation of naval armaments.

Notes

References

Bibliography

External links 
 

 

O'Brien-class destroyers
Ships built in Bath, Maine
1914 ships
World War I destroyers of the United States
Ships of the United States Coast Guard